Coquille School District (8) is a public school district that serves the city of Coquille, Oregon, United States.

The Coquille School District #8 is located in Southwestern Oregon 20 miles from the Oregon coast.  The Coquille School District operates five schools: Lincoln School of Early Learning - grades pre-school-first grade Coquille Valley Elementary School -2 through 6 and Coquille Junior/Senior High- 7 through 12, Winter Lakes High School an alternative school serving grades 8-12, and Winter Lakes Elementary an alternative school that serves students in grades K-7.

School Board
The Coquille School Board is made up of seven elected officials. Each board member serves a four-year term.
Chair: Heather Echavarria
Vice-Chair: Roy Wright
Director: Julie Nighswonger
Director: Steve Britton
Director: Melinda Millett
Director: Lucas Taylor
Director:  Cliff Wheeler

Labor Union Representation 
Coquille School District teachers are represented by the Coquille Education Association. Classified staff are represented by the Oregon School Employees Association

Administration
Superintendent: Wayne Gallagher,
Coquille Jr/Sr High Principal: Jeff Philley,
Coquille Valley Elementary Principal: Armando Ruiz,
Lincoln School of Early Learning Principal: Maidie Rosengarden,
Winter Lakes Elementary Principal: Sharon Nelson,
Winter Lakes High School Principal: Tiffany Clapper 
CTE and Alternative Ed Coordinator: Tony Jones
Director of Special Programs: Joan Oakey

Leadership Team
Business Manager: Jerod Nunn
Transportation Director: Keryn Ogle
Maintenance: Carl Hull
Food Service: Valerie Bergstedt
Technology: Sean Wirebaugh
Human Resources: Rachel Price

Demographics
The district serves approximately  1300 students and employs 180 staff members.

Schools

Early Learning 
Lincoln School of Early Learning - serves pre-school (age 3), pre-kindergarten (age 4), full day kindergarten (age 5), and first grade. The staff works closely with families to create a schedule that meets the needs of early learners.

Elementary school
Coquille Valley Elementary CVE is home of the Eagles and serves students in grades 2–6.

Secondary schools
Coquille High School
The junior high which serves students in grades 7–8, occupies one wing of the school. Students have elective opportunities that include - art, music, foods, CTE, PE, and yearbook. Extra-curricular offerings include robotics, cross country, volleyball, football, basketball (boys & girls), wrestling, track (boys & girls), knowledge bowl.

The high school houses grades 9-12 and is highly rated by the state of Oregon. The Coquille High School graduation rate is frequently in the top 10% in Oregon. Students have opportunities to earn college credits while at Coquille High School through Southwest Oregon Community College. 
Elective offerings include - Spanish, foods, CTE, careers, drama, art, music, and advanced science classes. 
Extra-curricular opportunities include robotics, soccer (boys & girls), cross country (boys & girls), volleyball, football (2021 OSAA State Champions), wrestling, basketball (boys & girls), baseball, softball, track (boys & girls), and speech/debate.

Alternative Education 
Winter Lakes School is an alternative school that offers students the option of attending classes on campus or online. Students from 15 area school districts take advantage of WLS learning opportunities. Winter Lakes High School also houses the district's Career Technical Education which includes an on campus cosmetology program, heavy equipment simulators, construction, and electric vehicle production.

References

External links
Coquille School District (official website)

School districts in Oregon
Education in Coos County, Oregon